Stefano Quantestorie is a 1993  Italian comedy film written, directed and starred by Maurizio Nichetti.

Plot 
Stefano, at forty years old, is looking back at his life and at the lost opportunities to living it in a different way: if at seventeen he had moved in America, if he had become an aviator, if he had graduated and had become a professor, if he had become a police officer... destiny will give him a chance to meet all his doppelgangers.

Cast 
 Maurizio Nichetti: Stefano 
 James Thiérrée: Stefano at 17 
 Elena Sofia Ricci: Angela 
 Caterina Sylos Labini: Costanza 
 Amanda Sandrelli: Chiara 
 Milena Vukotic: Mother of Stefano 
 Renato Scarpa: Father of Stefano
 Lidia Broccolino: Marta

See also  
List of Italian films of 1993

References

External links

Stefano Quantestorie at Variety Distribution

1993 films
Films directed by Maurizio Nichetti
Italian comedy films
1993 comedy films
Italian alternate history films
1990s Italian-language films
1990s Italian films